Egogepa crassata is a species of moth of the family Tortricidae. It is found in Tibet.

References

Moths described in 2006
Archipini